One Post Office Square is a 42-floor modern skyscraper in the Financial District section of Boston, Massachusetts. The skyscraper is Boston's 12th-tallest building, standing 525 feet (160 m) tall. The building has exactly 831,975 square feet of Class A office space. An attached, eight-level parking garage offers 368 parking spaces and direct access to the building's lobby. It overlooks Post Office Square Park and was designed by Jung Brannen Associates. A previous building on the site at 101 Milk Street was the headquarters of the Boston Elevated Railway until about 1919.

Design and features
The exterior is modern style sculpted tower that consists of a steel frame with a concrete aggregate facade.

The three-story lobby is finished in patterned Rosso Verona and travertine marble walls and floors accented with mirror bronze signage, hand rails, and window bands.
HVAC is controlled by an automated, Energy Management System for maximum comfort and efficiency. The building is connected to the adjoining Langham Hotel  at ground level by a private passageway.

In 2018, the building began renovations to update the exterior of the building and add additional space. The project is set to be complete in 2021.

Awards
 Building Owners and Managers Association (BOMA)  Landlord of the Year Award, 2000

See also

 List of tallest buildings in Boston

References

External links

 
 Photo of building
 
 Lobby Travertine vendor – Euromarble, Carrara Italy includes photo

Skyscraper office buildings in Boston
Jung Brannen buildings
Office buildings completed in 1981